The two Hindenburg-class airships were hydrogen-filled, passenger-carrying rigid airships built in Germany in the 1930s and named in honor of Paul von Hindenburg. They were the last such aircraft to be constructed, and in terms of their length, height, and volume, the largest aircraft ever built. During the 1930s, airships like the Hindenburg class were widely considered the future of air travel, and the lead ship of the class, LZ 129 Hindenburg, established a regular transatlantic service. The airship's destruction in a highly publicized accident was the end of these expectations. The second ship, LZ 130 Graf Zeppelin, was never operated on a regular passenger service, and was scrapped in 1940 along with its namesake predecessor, the LZ 127 Graf Zeppelin, by order of Hermann Göring.

Design and development 

The Hindenburg class were built entirely from duralumin. The leader of the design team was Ludwig Dürr, who had overseen the design of all Zeppelins except LZ-1 (on which he was a crew member), under the overall direction of Hugo Eckener, the head of the company.

The design originally called for cabins for 50 passengers and a crew complement of 40.

Construction of the first ship, LZ 129, later named Hindenburg, began in 1931, but was suddenly stopped when Luftschiffbau Zeppelin went bankrupt.  This led Eckener to make a deal with the Nazi Party, which had come to power in 1933.  He needed money to build the airship; in return he was forced to display the swastika on the fins.  Construction resumed in 1935. The keel of the second ship, LZ 130 Graf Zeppelin was laid on June 23, 1936, and the cells were inflated with hydrogen on August 15, 1938.  As the second Zeppelin to carry the name Graf Zeppelin (after the LZ 127), it is often referred to as Graf Zeppelin II.

The duralumin frame was covered by cotton cloth varnished with iron oxide and cellulose acetate butyrate impregnated with aluminium powder.  The aluminium was added to reflect both ultraviolet, which damaged the fabric, and infrared light, which caused heating of the gas.  This was an innovation that was first used on the LZ 126, which was provided as war reparations to the United States and served as the USS Los Angeles (ZR-3) from 1924 until decommissioned in 1933. 

The structure was held together by many large rings, 15 of which were gas cell boundaries which formed bulkheads.  These bulkheads were braced by steel wires which connected up into the axial catwalk.  The longitudinal duralumin girders connected all the rings together and formed "panels".  The 16 gas cells were made of cotton and a gas-tight material.  On Graf Zeppelin, the cells were lightened and one was made of lightweight silk instead of cotton.

Hydrogen was vented out through valves on the top of the ship. These valves could be controlled both manually and automatically. The axial catwalk was added across the center of the ship to provide access to the gas valves. A keel catwalk provided access to the crew quarters and the engines. Alongside the keel were water ballast and fuel tanks. The lower tail fin also had an auxiliary control room in case the controls in the gondola malfunctioned.

Although the Graf Zeppelin had the same engine car design in its early stages of construction, the pods were later completely redesigned to power tractor propellers. The engines had a water recovery system which captured water from exhaust of the engines to replace ballast jettisoned during flight.

To reduce drag, the passenger rooms were contained entirely within the hull, rather than in the gondola as on the LZ 127 Graf Zeppelin, on two decks.  The upper deck, "A", contained the passenger quarters, public areas, a dining room, a lounge, and a writing room.  The lower deck, "B", contained washrooms, a mess hall for the crew, and a smoking lounge.  Long slanted windows ran the length of both decks.  The passenger decks were redesigned for Graf Zeppelin; the restaurant was moved to the middle of the quarters and the promenade windows were half a panel lower.

Lift gas
Hindenburg was originally designed for helium, heavier than hydrogen but nonflammable. In the 1920s the United States possessed a monopoly on the production of helium, obtained as a byproduct of natural gas production. The U.S. Congress banned its export under the Helium Act of 1925 in an effort to conserve helium for use in U.S. Navy airships. Eckener expected this ban to be lifted, but to save helium the design was modified to have double gas cells (an inner hydrogen cell protected by an outer helium cell). The ban remained however, so the engineers used only hydrogen despite its extreme flammability. This provided a margin above the  average gross weight of the ship with fuel, equipment,  of mail and cargo, about 90 passengers and crew and their luggage.

The Germans had extensive experience with hydrogen as a lifting gas.  Accidental hydrogen fires had never occurred on civilian Zeppelins, so the switch from helium to hydrogen did not cause much concern.  Hydrogen also increased lift by about 8%.  After the Hindenburg disaster Eckener vowed to never use hydrogen again in a passenger airship.  He planned to use helium for the second ship and went to Washington, D.C., to personally lobby President Roosevelt, who promised to supply the helium only for peaceful purposes.  After the annexation of Austria in March 1938, U.S. Secretary of the Interior Harold L. Ickes refused to supply the gas, and the Graf Zeppelin II was also filled with hydrogen.

Operational history

LZ 129 Hindenburg 

Hindenburg made her first flight on 4 March 1936, but before commencing its intended role as a passenger liner, was put to use for propaganda purposes by the Nazi government. Together with LZ 127 Graf Zeppelin, it spent four days dropping leaflets, playing music, and making radio broadcasts in the lead up to the March 29 plebiscite mandating Hitler's Chancellorship and remilitarization of the Rhineland.

Commercial services commenced on 31 March 1936 with the first of seven round trips to Rio de Janeiro that Hindenburg was to make during her first passenger season. Together with ten round trips to New York City, Hindenburg covered  that year with 2,798 passengers and 160 tons of freight and mail.

Following refurbishment during the winter, Hindenburg set out on her first flight to North America for the 1937 season (she had already made one return trip to South America in 1937) on 3 May, bound for New York. This flight would end in tragedy with Hindenburg being utterly consumed by fire as it prepared to dock at NAS Lakehurst in New Jersey.

LZ 130 Graf Zeppelin II

By the time the Graf Zeppelin II was completed, it was obvious that the ship would never serve its intended purpose as a passenger liner; the lack of a supply of inert helium was one cause. The ship was christened and made her first flight on September 14, 1938, making a circuit from Friedrichshafen to München, Augsburg, Ulm, and back. The Graf Zeppelin II made a total of thirty flights, mainly spy missions for the Luftwaffe.

Scrapping 

In April 1940, Hermann Göring issued the order to scrap both Graf Zeppelins and the unfinished framework of LZ 131, since the metal was needed for the construction of airplanes. By April 27, work crews had finished cutting up the airships. On May 6, the enormous airship hangars in Frankfurt were leveled by explosives, three years to the day after the destruction of the Hindenburg.

Specifications

See also
 Harold G. Dick
 List of Zeppelins

References

Sammt, Albert. 1988. Mein Leben für den Zeppelin, Verlag Pestalozzi Kinderdorf Wahlwies 1988,  - pages 167-168 extract covering LZ 130's spying trip from 2 to 4 August 1939, (German) (pdf)

External links 
Comparison between LZ 130 Graf Zeppelin and LZ 129 Hindenburg
Airships.net: photographs of interior and exterior of LZ-129 Hindenburg

1930s German airliners
Zeppelins